Standing Room Only is a 1912 American silent short romantic comedy film starring William Garwood, and Mignon Anderson.

Cast
 Mignon Anderson as The Cook
 William Garwood as The Cook's Sweetheart

External links

1912 films
Thanhouser Company films
American romantic comedy films
American silent short films
American black-and-white films
1910s romantic comedy films
1912 short films
1912 comedy films
1910s American films
Silent romantic comedy films
Silent American comedy films
1910s English-language films
American comedy short films